The Men's 100 metres T34 event for the 2012 Summer Paralympics took place at the London Olympic Stadium on 8 September.

Records
Prior to the competition, the existing World and Paralympic records were as follows.

Ahmad Almutairi of Kuwait, classified T33, competed in this event as there was no T33 competition. Although he set a World Record (for his classification) of 17.67s in the heats, he failed to reach the final.

Results

Round 1
Competed 8 September 2012 from 11:10. Qual. rule: First 3 in each heat (Q) plus the 2 fastest other times (q) qualified.

Heat 1

Heat 2

Final
Competed 8 September 2012 at 19:56.

 
Q = qualified by place. q = qualified by time. WRC = World Record for athlete's classification. PR = Paralympic Record. RR = Regional Record. PB = Personal Best.

References

Athletics at the 2012 Summer Paralympics
2012 in men's athletics